Douglas Houston (born 13 April 1943 in Glasgow) is a Scottish former footballer who played midfield. Houston, who played around half his career with Dundee, also played for Queen's Park, Rangers, Dundee United and St Johnstone, before becoming manager at Brechin City and then Forfar Athletic. Houston won a Scottish League Cup runners-up medal with Dundee and a Scottish Cup runners-up medal during his time with Dundee United.

Honours
 League Cup: Runner-up
 1967–68
 Scottish Cup: Runner-up
 1973–74

External links 
 

1943 births
Living people
Footballers from Glasgow
Scottish footballers
Queen's Park F.C. players
Dundee F.C. players
Rangers F.C. players
Dundee United F.C. players
St Johnstone F.C. players
Scottish football managers
Brechin City F.C. managers
Forfar Athletic F.C. managers
Scottish Football League players
Scottish Football League managers
Association football midfielders
Scotland amateur international footballers